Bizovac is a town and a municipality in Osijek-Baranja County, Croatia.

Population

There are a total of 4,507 inhabitants in the municipality (census 2011), in the following settlements:

 Bizovac, population 2,043
 Brođanci, population 547
 Cerovac, population 24
 Cret Bizovački, population 604
 Habjanovci, population 460
 Novaki Bizovački, population 203
 Samatovci, population 613
 Selci, population 13

97.76% of the population are Croats (2011 census).

Attractions
Bizovac has a hotel and spa complex, with underground heated water originating from the remains of Pannonian Sea that covered the region. Bizovac also has one of the rarest and most beautiful Croatian folkloric costumes, and some of the finest cakes and cuisine.

References

External links

 
 Tourist website

Municipalities of Osijek-Baranja County
Spa towns in Croatia